1-Hydroxy-7-azabenzotriazole (HOAt) is a triazole used as a peptide coupling reagent. It suppresses the racemization.
 
HOAt has a melting point between 213 and 216 degrees Celsius. As a liquid, it is transparent and without any color.

References

Peptide coupling reagents
Triazolopyridines
Reagents for biochemistry
Hydroxylamines